Andrew James Quin (born 12 August 1960) is a British composer and jazz pianist who works in TV and film. His music has appeared in Hollywood movies, advertising campaigns, and television programs. His work has appeared in British TV shows such as Coronation Street and Holby City.

Early life
Born in London in 1960, Quin began playing the piano at the age of four. He was not from a musical family. He was offered a scholarship to study classical piano at the Royal College of Music, but he turned down the place in order to pursue his growing interests in improvisation, composition and music technology. By his early teens, he was accompanying silent movies, drumming in a rock band and regularly performing professional gigs.

Quin went on to study at Keele University, Staffordshire, where his final year dissertation was on the music of Earth, Wind and Fire. He graduated in Music and Electronics, having worked extensively with BAFTA-winning composer Tim Souster, as well as continuing his jazz interests with Cecil Lytle.

Career
Quin has recorded more than 90 albums for the De Wolfe Music production music library since 1984. His album Mirage (DWCD 0001) was the first CD of the world's first digital music library. Mirage was recorded on the Fairlight CMI. His early albums on vinyl are now collectors items.

Quin has composed and recorded music for hundreds of television shows, films and adverts. The 1998 After Eight 'Perfect Dinner Party' advert, featured film of Liberace miming to Quin's piano playing. He now has well over one thousand published tracks.

References

External links

Biography at allaboutjazz.com
Andy Quin : Virtuoso Pianist   Jazz performer   Composer  Organist

Living people
1960 births
English composers
English jazz pianists
21st-century pianists